The Elm Street Apartments is a building complex located in southwest Portland, Oregon listed on the National Register of Historic Places.

See also
 National Register of Historic Places listings in Southwest Portland, Oregon

References

Further reading

1916 establishments in Oregon
Arts and Crafts architecture in Oregon
Bungalow architecture in Oregon
Prairie School architecture in Oregon
Residential buildings completed in 1916
Apartment buildings on the National Register of Historic Places in Portland, Oregon
Southwest Hills, Portland, Oregon
Portland Historic Landmarks